The Fayetteville Times is a morning newspaper that was published in Fayetteville, North Carolina from 1970 to 1990.  The Times was consolidated with the larger afternoon-only newspaper, The Fayetteville Observer, to form the consolidated morning daily newspaper, The Fayetteville Observer-Times.

Defunct newspapers published in North Carolina
Mass media in Fayetteville, North Carolina